Teams made up of athletes representing different National Olympic Committees (NOCs), called mixed-NOCs teams, participated in the 2010 Summer Youth Olympics. These teams participated in either events composed entirely of mixed-NOCs teams, or in events which saw the participation of mixed-NOCs teams and non-mixed-NOCs teams. When a mixed-NOCs team won a medal, the Olympic flag was raised rather than a national flag; if a mixed-NOCs team won gold, the Olympic anthem would be played instead of national anthems.

Background  
The concept of mixed-NOCs was newly introduced in the 2010 Summer Youth Olympics, in which athletes from different nations would compete in the same team, often representing their continent. This is in contrast to the Mixed team (IOC code: ZZX) found at early senior Olympic Games.

Medal summary  
The following medal summary lists all nations whose athletes won a medal while competing for a mixed-NOCs team. If there is more than one athlete from the same nation on a medal-winning team, only one medal of that colour is credited, so therefore in this medal summary Italy are credited with only one gold rather than five for their participation in the gold-winning fencing team. The summary shows how many events at which a nation had an athlete in a medal-winning mixed-NOCs team; as an example, the United States had athletes in two gold-winning mixed-NOCs teams and athletes in two bronze-winning mixed-NOCs teams and is therefore listed with two golds and two bronzes.

A total of 63 National Olympic Committees, including hosts Singapore, had at least one athlete representing a mixed-NOCs team win a medal.

Archery

Athletics

Equestrian

Fencing

Judo

Modern pentathlon

Table tennis

Tennis

Triathlon

See also
 2010 Summer Youth Olympics medal table
Mixed-NOCs at the Youth Olympics

References

2010 Summer Youth Olympics
Mixed teams at the Youth Olympics